Liaozhai zhiyi, sometimes shortened to Liaozhai, known in English as Strange Tales from a Chinese Studio,  Strange Stories from a Chinese Studio, or Strange Tales from Make-Do Studio, is a collection of Classical Chinese stories by Qing dynasty writer Pu Songling, comprising close to 500 stories or "marvel tales" in the zhiguai and chuanqi styles, which according to some critics, served to implicitly criticise societal problems. Written over a period of forty years from the late 1600s and ending in the early 1700s, it circulated in manuscripts that were copied and recopied among the author's friends but did not appear in print until 1766. Since then, many of the critically lauded stories have been adapted for other media such as film and television.

Publication history

Pu assembled the nearly five hundred anecdotes and lengthy tales over a period of forty years between the early 1670s and the early 1700s. As was the convention of his time, Pu titled his work using the sobriquet Liaozhai, translated into English as the "Studio of Conversation" or "Studio of Leisure".

The scholar Zhang Peiheng writes that the original Liaozhai comprised eight volumes, the earliest and latest of which were completed around 1681 and 1707 to 1714 respectively. The compilation was first circulated in scribal copies but it was not published until after the author's death in 1715. Shandong financial commissioner Yu Chenglong reportedly offered Pu a thousand taels circa 1693 in exchange for his Liaozhai manuscript, but Pu declined his offer. The final manuscript was "carefully preserved" by the Pu family after his death, with many different individuals, including the local magistrate, requesting to make copies of it. The earliest surviving print version of Liaozhai was printed in 1766 in Hangzhou by publisher Zhao Qigao, who claimed that Pu originally intended for his anthology to be titled Tales of Ghosts and Foxes. Although Zhao also alleged that his publication was based on the "original manuscript" as was copied by a friend, it did not contain all the stories found in the original manuscript; in the preface to his publication, he writes, "I have expunged simple and brief notes which are dull and commonplace, forty-eight in all." Moreover, Zhao censored stories that had "brief references to sensitive topics". Nonetheless, the Zhao edition was well-received and was first republished by scholar Li Shixian in 1767.

At some point after 1871, Pu Jieren, a seventh-generation descendant of Pu Songling, had the original manuscript, which was reportedly made up of twenty volumes, rebound in eight volumes. They were then kept in two boxes, one of which disappeared "under circumstances which are still obscure". In 1950, the Pu family donated the surviving four volumes, which contained some 237 short stories, to the Liaoning Provincial Library.

Themes
Unlike much Chinese and Western horror fiction, the "scary stories" in Liaozhai are not intended to be frightening, but to blur the borders between the supernatural and everyday reality, using physical and psychological detail to make the move between these realms seem natural. These romantic tales explore the philosophical concept of qing (情), the passionate and emotional entanglement of the world, be it human or supernatural.

Literary significance
Liaozhai zhiyi is the most acclaimed Chinese "supernatural tales" collection since the three major Ming dynasty hua (話) collections, which are the Jiandeng Xinhua (剪燈新話) by Qu You, the Jiandeng Yuhua (剪燈餘話) by Li Changqi, and the Mideng Yinhua (覓燈因話) by Shao Jingzhan; these three had a far-reaching impact across East Asia.  Early commentary on Liaozhai regarded it as a "superior but typical example" of the zhiguai genre. Subsequent critics and writers disagreed with such a view, instead focusing on the allegorical nature of the stories instead; for instance, Yu Ji, who was Zhao Qigao's secretary, wrote in his preface to Zhao's edition of Liaozhai: "... saying that it differs little from collections of rare phenomena or strange tales is a very shallow view and one that greatly contradicts the author's intent." Pu's grandson, Pu Lide, viewed the work as "an act of serious self-expression". Still later critics in the nineteenth-century focused on the "literary style and narrative technique" of Liaozhai. Qing dynasty critic Dan Minglun writes in the preface to his 1842 interlinear commentary of Liaozhai: "From Liaozhai, I also gained insight into literary methods." Around the same period, Liaozhai also attracted critical attention from Western writers, for example, Samuel Wells Williams mentioned Liaozhai in his writings as "a perfect work with pure language and elegant style" and its "beautiful writing style" has also received praises from the likes of William Frederick Mayers and Karl Gützlaff.

Since the 20th-century, its literary status was further elevated.  Guo Moruo said of Liaozhai that "The writing of ghosts and demons is superior to all others; the satire on corruption and tyranny is penetrating to the marrow."  Yuken Fujita of Keio University wrote in 1954 that "Among the many literary works that are descended from ancient Chinese fiction [i.e. Bowuzhi, Soushen Ji, Shishuo Xinyu, Lieyi Zhuan, Shi Yi Ji, etc.], it [Liaozhai] has already established a reputation as the most outstanding short story collection." Hiromasa Imai describes Liaozhai as "the pinnacle of ghost literature." Strange Tales from a Chinese Studio was also listed by Jorge Luis Borges as one of his favorite books.

Select translations

English
 Strange Tales from Liaozhai (tr. Sidney L. Sondergard). Jain Pub Co., 2008. .
 Strange Tales from a Chinese Studio (tr. John Minford). London: Penguin, 2006. 562 pages. .
 Strange Tales from the Liaozhai Studio (Zhang Qingnian, Zhang Ciyun and Yang Yi). Beijing: People's China Publishing, 1997. .
 Strange Tales from Make-do Studio (Denis C. & Victor H. Mair). Beijing: Foreign Languages Press, 1989. .
 Strange Tales of Liaozhai (Lu Yunzhong, Chen Tifang, Yang Liyi, and Yang Zhihong). Hong Kong: Commercial Press, 1982.
 Strange Stories from the Lodge of Leisure (George Soulie). London: Constable, 1913.
 Strange Stories from a Chinese Studio (tr. Herbert A. Giles). London: T. De La Rue, 1880; 2nd ed. revised, London, 1908; 3rd ed. revised, London, Laurie, 1916.  Reprinted with a new foreword by Victoria Cass. Tokyo, Rutland, Vt.: Tuttle, 2010. .

Giles's translation
John Minford and Tong Man describe Herbert Giles's translation as "prudish", because he chose not to translate "anything connected with sex, procreation, blood, sometimes indeed the human body in any of its aspects" and often made "extraordinary lengths to cover up his traces, showing considerable craft and cunning." In the Giles translation fox spirits wish to chat and share tea with people rather than trying to seduce and engage in sexual intercourse, and romantic partners at most exchange kisses. They wrote that "Giles was a creature of his time" since he was required to follow Victorian Era morality, and urged readers to "not get Giles' bowdlerising of Liao-chai out of proportion." They added that "the widely distributed Commercial Press (HK) edition of the stories makes many of the same prudish cuts as Giles."

Minford and Tong Man write that people have continued reading Giles's translations even though they "have been at best quietly tolerated, more often derided, and dismissed as orientalist bowdlerisations..." Lydia Chiang describes Minford and Tong Man's essay as a "post-Saidian re-evaluation" that compares the Giles translation to traditional and modern Chinese representations of the story.

German
Martin Buber made the first German translation of the work, included within his Chinesische Geister- und Liebesgeschichten. Buber had assistance from a person named Wang Jingdao. Buber stated in the preface of his translation that his translation had portions previously untranslated in Giles work because Giles, according to the "English custom", had "omitted or paraphrased all passages which seemed to him indecorous". The Chinesische Geister- und Liebesgeschichten was translated into English by Alex Page, published in 1991 by the Humanities Press.

Other translations
Vasily Mikhaylovich Alekseyev published an acclaimed translation of Pu Songling's stories in Russian in two volumes, Fox's Wiles (1922) and The Wizard Monks (1923). It has been cited as the most accomplished translation of the book into a foreign language. The book was translated into Manchu as Sonjofi ubaliyambuha Liyoo jai jy i bithe. Lodovico Nicola di Giura (1868–1947) produced a complete Italian translation of the 1766 edition.

Adaptations
 Liaozhai Zhiyi has inspired many Chinese film adaptations, including those by King Hu (Painted Skin, A Touch of Zen), Gordon Chan (Painted Skin, Mural), Ching Siu-tung (A Chinese Ghost Story series) and the Taiwanese director Li Han-Hsiang (The Enchanting Shadow).
 Jonathan D. Spence. The Death of Woman Wang. (New York: Viking Press,  1978). . Uses material from Liaozhai Zhiyi to set the background.

References

Citations

Bibliography

 
 

 Chiang, Lydia Sing-Chen (2005). Collecting The Self: Body And Identity In Strange Tale Collections Of Late Imperial China (Sinica Leidensia Volume 67). Brill. , 9789004142039.
 
 Chang, Chun-shu and Shelley Hsueh-lun Chang (1998) Redefining History: Ghosts, Spirits, and Human Society in P'u Sung-ling's World, 1640-1715. Ann Arbor: University of Michigan Press. 
 Luo, Hui (University of Toronto Department of East Asian Studies). "The Ghost Of liaozhai: Pu Songling’S Ghostlore And Its History Of Reception." (PhD thesis) (Archive) 2009.
 . A selective and annotated bibliography, with a section on Liaozhai
 .

External links

 Selection of stories as translated by Herbert Giles, 1916 from Google Books
 Strange Stories from a Chinese Studio, 1880, translated and annotated by Herbert A. Giles at Internet Archive
 
 
 (Giles translation)

1766 short story collections
Books published posthumously
Chinese mythology
Chinese short story collections
Collections of fairy tales
Horror novels
Literature featuring anthropomorphic foxes
Short stories set in Imperial China
Qing dynasty literature
Romantic fantasy novels
Shenmo fiction